Our Lady of Guadalupe School can refer to:
Our Lady of Guadalupe School (Houston)
Our Lady of Guadalupe School (Laredo, Texas)
Our Lady of Guadalupe School v. Morrissey-Berru, a U.S. Supreme Court case